Mary Rose Helen "Coky" Giedroyc (born 6 February 1963) is an English director known for her work on Women Talking Dirty, The Virgin Queen, The Nativity, and Penny Dreadful.

Early life
Giedroyc was born in Kowloon on 6 February 1963. She grew up in Leatherhead, Surrey. Her father was Michal Giedroyc (1929–2017), a historian of Polish-Lithuanian descent from the aristocratic Giedroyć family, who came to England in 1947. Her mother, Rosy, is of English descent. Her younger sister, Mel Giedroyc, is a television presenter. Her other sister, Kasia, is a children's writer who later married diplomat Philip Parham. She attended Bristol University, where she first began to make films.

Career
Giedroyc has directed several films, including Women Talking Dirty and Stella Does Tricks; she is best known for her work directing television dramas, which have included Wuthering Heights, The Virgin Queen, Oliver Twist, Fear of Fanny, Carrie's War, and three episodes of Blackpool.

In 2007 she was nominated, with Paula Milne and Paul Rutman, for a Best Drama Serial BAFTA Award for The Virgin Queen. In 2010, her directing work for the BBC television series The Nativity was praised by critics, although the story portrayed some controversial elements that caused debate between Christians due to its modern dramatisations of the birth of Christ.

Giedroyc directed A Study in Pink, originally filmed as a 60-minute pilot for the television series Sherlock, which was written by Steven Moffat. The BBC decided not to broadcast the episode because they wished to change the broadcast length to 90 minutes. However, the pilot was released on the DVD of the first series, and it proved to be slightly different from the final version. She has also directed BBC's The Hour and What Remains. Giedroyc directed two episodes of the 2014 Showtime horror television series Penny Dreadful.

On 20 December 2015, Giedroyc directed the live television production of The Sound of Music, starring Kara Tointon as Maria, and her sister Mel Giedroyc as Frau Schmidt. The two-and-a-half-hour ITV transmission was the first musical to be broadcast live on national television in the UK, and had a cast and crew of more than 400 and 177 costumes.

In 2018, it was announced Giedroyc would direct How to Build a Girl, based upon the novel of the same name by Caitlin Moran, who also wrote the film's screenplay alongside John Niven. Beanie Feldstein, Alfie Allen, Paddy Considine, Sarah Solemani, Joanna Scanlan, Arinze Kene and Frank Dillane will star in the film.

In June 2021, Giedroyc won her second BAFTA for Best Series for her work on Channel 4's Save Me Too, written and starring Lennie James.

In 2022 it was announced that Giedroyc would direct the upcoming film Greatest Days (film), scheduled to be released in summer 2023. The film is a feature adaptation of The Band musical featuring the songs of Take That.

Personal life
Giedroyc married her first husband at 21, and they had a son together before divorcing. In 1998, she married production designer Sir Thomas Weyland Bowyer-Smyth, 15th Baronet, with whom she has two children.

Filmography

Film

Television

References

External links

1963 births
Alumni of the University of Bristol
English people of Belgian descent
English people of Polish descent
English film directors
English people of Lithuanian descent
English women film directors
Coky
Living people
People from Leatherhead
British people of Belarusian descent
English television directors
British women television directors
Wives of baronets